Paranaiguara is a municipality in south Goiás state, Brazil.

Location and Geography
Paranaiguara is in the Quirinópolis Microregion, whose most important city is Quirinópolis.  The distance to the state capital, Goiânia, is 351 km.  Highway connections are made by BR-060 / Abadia de Goiás / Guapó / Indiara / Acreúna / GO-164 / Quirinópolis / BR-483 / GO-164. See Sepin

There are municipal boundaries with:
north:  Quirinópolis
south:  São Simão
east:  São Simão and Santa Vitória, Minas Gerais
west:  Cachoeira Alta and Caçu

The climate is temperate tropical, with an average annual temperature of 26 °C.  There are maximums of 26 °C and minimums of 10 °C.  The main river is the Paranaíba, which has tributaries such as the Rio Claro and Ribeirão Alegre.

Demographics
Population density in 2007: 6.69 inhabitants/km2 
Population growth rate 1996/2007: -0.67.%
Total population in 2007: 7,724
Total population in 1980: 6,782
Urban population in 2007: 6,991
Rural population in 2007: 733
Population change: the population has increased by about 960 inhabitants since 1980.

The economy
The economy is based on agriculture, cattle raising, services, public administration, and small transformation industries. In the secondary sector there are clothing industries, brickworks, and a paving company.  The cattle herd had 110,000 head (2006) and the main agricultural crops were corn and soybeans.

Economic Data (2007)
Industrial establishments: 18
Financial institutions:  Banco Itaú S.A. (August/2007)
Retail establishments in 2007: 88
Automobiles: 976 (2007)

Main agricultural products in ha.(2006)
rice:        170  
manioc:       40 
corn:      200
soybeans: 400

Farm Data (2006)in ha.
Number of farms:                239
Total area:                  92,485 
Area of permanent crops:       78
Area of perennial crops:     1,433
Area of natural pasture:     71,227 
Persons dependent on farming: 566
Farms with tractors:            102
Number of tractors:             143 IBGE

Education and Health
There were 05 schools (2006) and 01 hospital with 23 beds (2007). 
Adult literacy rate: 84.3% (2000) (national average was 86.4%)
Infant mortality rate: 22.10 (2000) (national average was 33.0)
Ranking on the Municipal Human Development Index:  0.751 (middle)

For the complete list see Frigoletto.com

History
Paranaiguara began in the 1930s when diamond prospectors came into the area.  In 1950 the settlement became a district of Quirinópolis and in 1967 it got its emancipation with the present name.  The name means "inhabitants of the great river" in Tupi-guarani.  In 1976 the construction of the São Simão Dam and reservoir forced the evacuation of the old town, which was moved 15 kilometers away.

See also
List of municipalities in Goiás
Microregions of Goiás
Quirinópolis Microregion

References

Frigoletto
 Sepin

Municipalities in Goiás